Ejiri (江尻) is a Japanese surname. Notable people with the surname include:

 (born 1967), Japanese footballer
 (born 1975), Japanese manga artist

See also
, Tōkaidō station in Shizuoka, Shizuoka Prefecture, Japan
, city tram station in Takaoka, Toyama Prefecture, Japan

Japanese-language surnames